Pinned is the fifth studio album by American noise rock band A Place to Bury Strangers. It was released on April 13, 2018 under Dead Oceans.

Release
On January 31, 2018, the band announced the release of the album, alongside the first single "Never Coming Back". On March 1, 2018 the band released a music video directed by Elizabeth Skadden for the next single, "There's Only One of Us". The third single "Frustrated Operator" was released on April 11, 2018.

Tour
The band announced a world tour in support of the album from March 2018 to June 2018.

Critical reception
Pinned was met with "generally favorable" reviews from critics. At Metacritic, which assigns a weighted average rating out of 100 to reviews from mainstream publications, this release received an average score of 68, based on 10 reviews. Aggregator Album of the Year gave the release 61 out of 100 based on a critical consensus of 12 reviews.

Accolades

Track listing

Charts

Personnel
 Miles Johnson – art direction
 Heba Kadry – mastering
 Ebru Yildiz – photography

References

2018 albums
A Place to Bury Strangers albums
Dead Oceans albums